Testicular receptor 4 also known as NR2C2 (nuclear receptor subfamily 2, group C, member 2) is a protein that in humans is encoded by the NR2C2 gene.

The testicular receptor 4 is a member of the nuclear receptor family of transcription factors.

Interactions 

Testicular receptor 4 has been shown to interact with 
 Androgen receptor,
 Estrogen receptor alpha, and
 Hepatocyte nuclear factor 4 alpha.

See also 
 Testicular receptor

References

Further reading

External links 
 

Intracellular receptors
Transcription factors